Aaron Augustus Sargent (September 28, 1827 – August 14, 1887) was an American journalist, lawyer, politician and diplomat. In 1878, Sargent historically introduced what would later become the 19th Amendment to the U.S. Constitution, giving women the right to vote. He was sometimes called the "Senator for the Southern Pacific Railroad".

Early life and education
Born in Newburyport, Massachusetts, he attended the common schools and then was apprenticed to a cabinetmaker. In his youth, he worked as a printer in Philadelphia and then, in 1847, moved to Washington, D.C., where he was a secretary to a Congressman.

Career 
He moved to California in 1849 and settled in Nevada City in 1850. There he was on the staff of the Nevada Daily Journal, eventually becoming that newspaper's owner. He was admitted to the California bar in 1854 and began practicing in Nevada City, becoming district attorney for Nevada County in 1856. He served in the California Senate in 1856.

Congress 
Sargent was elected as a Republican to the 37th Congress; skipped several terms and was reelected to the 41st and 42nd Congresses. In 1861 he was the author of the first Pacific Railroad Act that was passed in Congress.

He was elected to the United States Senate and served from 1873 to 1879. During his time in the Senate, he was chairman of the U.S. Senate Committee on Mines and Mining during the 44th Congress and chairman of the U.S. Senate Committee on Naval Affairs during the 45th Congress.

Women's rights 
In January 1878, Senator Sargent introduced the 29 words that would later become the 19th Amendment to the United States Constitution, allowing women the right to vote. Sargent's wife, Ellen Clark Sargent, was a leading voting rights advocate and a friend of such suffrage leaders as Susan B. Anthony. The bill calling for the amendment would be introduced unsuccessfully each year for the next forty years.

Ambassador to Germany 
Sargent returned to California in 1880. After leaving the Senate he practiced law in San Francisco for three years, leaving to become United States Ambassador to Germany for two years, and held office until German authorities excluded American pork from the German Empire which made his position personally distasteful. He turned down the appointment of Ambassador to Russia after William H. Hunt's death and made an unsuccessful attempt for the Republican nomination for the Senate in 1885.

Death and legacy 
He died in San Francisco in 1887. His original interment at Laurel Hill Cemetery in San Francisco, which closed by 1941. According to Sargent's descendants, A.A. Sargent's ashes were spread over the placer mine he had in Nevada City and a monument to him may be found in the old Pioneer Cemetery in Nevada City.

Sargent was a noted proponent of the Chinese Exclusion Act of 1882, arguing in Overland Monthly in support of exclusion and for the renewal of the 1882 Exclusion Act after its expiration in 1892. The Chinese Exclusion Act was eventually renewed in 1892, and again—indefinitely—in 1902, staying in effect until 1943.

References

Further reading

External links

1827 births
1887 deaths
Republican Party California state senators
Ambassadors of the United States to Germany
District attorneys in California
Lawyers from San Francisco
19th-century American newspaper publishers (people)
American people in rail transportation
Politicians from San Francisco
People of California in the American Civil War
People from Nevada City, California
Politicians from Newburyport, Massachusetts
Republican Party United States senators from California
Ambassadors of the United States to Russia
19th-century American diplomats
Republican Party members of the United States House of Representatives from California
American suffragists
19th-century American journalists
American male journalists
19th-century American male writers
19th-century American politicians
Journalists from California
Activists from California
19th-century American lawyers
Burials at Laurel Hill Cemetery (San Francisco)